A mechanical horse is a machine that moved and is built to look like a horse, used either for amusement or for exercise.  Some look like a horse, others imitate the motion of a horse, and some are both.  Mechanical horses may include the following designs, many of which are patented.

It may also mean:
 Merry-go-round
 Equicizer, an American-made horse riding simulator
 Racewood, a British company that manufactures riding simulators
 Scammell Mechanical Horse, a type of lorry built by Scammell in the UK
 A type of kiddie ride that incorporates a horse design

See also
 Mechanical bull, a machine that replicates the sensation of riding a bucking animal

Simulator rides